Behnke Ranch is a 536-acre property in Pasco County, Florida being developed by Hines, a property development company with its U.S. headquarters in Texas.  It is zoned for 550 single-family homes, 200 townhouses, and 440 multi-family apartments, as well as officespace and light industry.

References

Economy of Florida